In statistical models applied to psychometrics, congeneric reliability  ("rho C")  a single-administration test score reliability (i.e., the reliability of persons over items holding occasion fixed[2]) coefficient, commonly referred to as composite reliability, construct reliability, and coefficient omega. 
 is a structural equation model(SEM)-based reliability coefficients and is obtained from on a unidimensional model. 
 is the second most commonly used reliability factor after tau-equivalent reliability(), and is often recommended as its alternative.

Formula and calculation

Systematic and conventional formula 

Let  denote the observed score of item  and  denote the sum of all items in a test consisting of  items. 
It is assumed that each item's (observation) score consists of the item's (unobserved) true score and the item's error (i.e.). 
The congeneric model assumes that each item's true score is a linear combination of a common factor (i.e.). 
 is often referred to as a factor loading of item . 
 is the sum of all the elements of the fitted/implied covariance matrix of  obtained from estimates of 's and 's.

's "systematic formula" is:
 
Its conventional (i.e., more often used) formula is:

Example 

These are the estimates of the factor loadings and errors:

Compare this value with the value of applying tau-equivalent reliability to the same data.

History
's formula was first introduced by Jöreskog (1971) in a matrix notation.
Its conventional formula first appeared in Werts et al. (1974).
They didn't give the formula a special name and just referred to it as "reliability."
In other words, this formula has no official name, and this absence causes various versions of the name to be created.

Names of congeneric reliability
 has been referred to by various names between applied researchers and between reliability researchers. In addition, the names used by applied researchers differ from the names used by reliability researchers. This diversity and difference create confusion and inaccuracies in communication.

Composite reliability
The term composite reliability is short for the 'reliability of composite scores'.
Unless measured by a single item, all reliability coefficients are composite reliability.
Therefore, this name is not suitable as a specific formula name.
The name composite reliability gives the impression that this reliability coefficient is complex, or that it has been synthesized from other reliability coefficients.

Werts et al. (1978) also called this formula "reliability."
However, they used the expression "the composite reliability" once as an abbreviation of the reliability of a composite score to distinguish the reliability of a single item. Since then, this unintended name has been used as the name of this formula.

Researchers who publish papers on reliability rarely use this name.

Construct reliability
Construct reliability is short for the 'reliability of a construct'.
Construct is synonymous with concept. A construct is a theoretical and abstract entity and is embodied through measurement.
We can estimate the reliability of a measurement, but not the reliability of a construct.
For example, you can say the reliability of "a measure of height," but not the reliability of the concept of "height."
Construct reliability is a term that is not logically established.

Let's say that this term makes sense.
All other reliability coefficients also originate from the measurement of a construct and should be called construct reliability.
Construct reliability is not suitable as a term referring to a specific reliability coefficient.

The term has been used in the books of Hair and his colleagues, the world's best sellers for practical statistical analysis.

Applied researchers use the term construct reliability at a frequency of 1/3 of composite reliability. Researchers who publish papers on reliability rarely use this name.

Coefficient omega

Therefore, it is difficult for readers to know exactly what the name  refers to. This practice reduces the accuracy of communication.

The name coefficient  is based on McDonald's (1985, 1999) claim that McDonald (1970) first developed .
In his paper on exploratory factor analysis (EFA), McDonald (1970) presents a reliability formula using the  symbol. This formula was included in the footnote of the article without any explanation. 
He also says that the  presented by McDonald (1970) is renamed . 
He explicitly declares that he first proposed . McDonald (1985, 1999)) does not cite Jöreskog (1971) or Werts et al. (1974).

The following objections were made. First, the formula proposed by McDonald (1970) was not new. If this formula were of high academic value at that time, it would not have been presented without explanation in the footnotes. In the context of EFA, there are studies suggesting similar reliability formulas.
Third, McDonald (1970) did not discuss how to actually obtain this coefficient. While it is easy to derive a reliability formula, the more important barrier at that time was how to obtain estimates of each parameter. Jöreskog has addressed this issue across studies.
Fourth, it was Jöreskog (1971) that actually influenced users. McDonald (1970) was occasionally cited in EFA literature, but rarely cited in reliability literature. The expression coefficients  was rarely used before 2009.

Applied researchers rarely use this name.
Researchers who publish papers on reliability often use this name recently.

Congeneric reliability
Unlike other names that give no information about the characteristics of the coefficients, the name congeneric reliability  contains information about when this coefficient should be used.

The name congeneric reliability has been used occasionally in reliability literature since then.

Related coefficients 

A related coefficient is average variance extracted.

References

External links 

RelCalc, tools to calculate congeneric reliability and other coefficients.
Handbook of Management Scales, Wikibook that contains management related measurement models, their indicators and often congeneric reliability.

Comparison of assessments
Psychometrics
Statistical reliability